The Hudson Institute is a conservative American research institute ("think tank") based in Washington, D.C. It was founded in 1961 in Croton-on-Hudson, New York, by futurist, military strategist, and systems theorist Herman Kahn and his colleagues at the RAND Corporation.

In January 2021, John P. Walters was appointed president and CEO of the Hudson Institute. Walters succeeded Kenneth R. Weinstein who had been CEO since June 2005 and was named president and CEO in March 2011.

History

Founding to 1982
Hudson Institute was founded in 1961 by Herman Kahn, Max Singer, and Oscar M. Ruebhausen. In 1960, while employed at the RAND Corporation, Kahn had given a series of lectures at Princeton University on scenarios related to nuclear war. In 1960, Princeton University Press published On Thermonuclear War, a book-length expansion of Kahn's lecture notes. Major controversies ensued, and in the end, Kahn and RAND had a parting of ways. Kahn moved to Croton-on-Hudson, New York, intending to establish a new think tank, less hierarchical and bureaucratic in its organization. Along with Max Singer, a young government lawyer who had been a RAND colleague of Kahn's, and New York attorney Oscar Ruebhausen, Kahn founded the Hudson Institute on 20 July 1961. Kahn was Hudson's driving intellect and Singer developed the institute's organization. Ruebhausen was an advisor to New York Governor Nelson Rockefeller.

Hudson's initial research projects largely represented Kahn's personal interests, which included the domestic and military use of nuclear power and scenario planning exercises about present policy options and their possible future outcomes. Kahn and his colleagues made pioneering contributions to nuclear deterrence theory and strategy during this period.

Hudson's detailed analyses of "ladders of escalation" and reports on the likely consequences of limited and unlimited nuclear exchanges, eventually published as Thinking About the Unthinkable in 1962 and On Escalation: Metaphors and Scenarios in 1965, were influential within the Kennedy administration, and helped the institute win its first major research contract from the Office of Civil Defense at the Pentagon.

Kahn did not want Hudson limited to defense-related research, and along with Singer, recruited a full-time professional staff from diverse academic backgrounds. Hudson Institute regularly involved a broad range of outside notables in their analytic projects and policy deliberations. These included French philosopher Raymond Aron, African-American novelist Ralph Ellison, political scientist Henry Kissinger, conceptual artist James Lee Byars, and social scientist Daniel Bell. Hudson's focus expanded to include geopolitics, economics, demography, anthropology, science and technology, education, and urban planning.

Kahn eventually expanded the use of scenario planning from defense policy work to economics, and in 1962 became the first analyst to predict the rise of Japan as the world's second-largest economy. Hudson Institute's publications soon became popular in Japan and Kahn developed close ties to numerous politicians and corporate leaders there.

Hudson Institute used scenario-planning techniques to forecast long-term developments and became renowned for its future studies. In 1967, Hudson published The Year 2000, a bestselling book, commissioned by the American Academy of Arts and Sciences. Many of the predictions proved correct, including technological developments like portable telephones and network-linked home and office computers.

In 1970, The Emerging Japanese Superstate, elaborating Kahn's predictions concerning the development of Japan, was published. After the Club of Rome's controversial 1972 report The Limits to Growth produced widespread alarm about the possibility that population growth and resource depletion might result in a 21st-century global "collapse", Hudson responded with an analysis of its own, The Next 200 Years, which concluded, instead, that scientific and practical innovations were likely to produce significantly better worldwide living standards. Maintaining this optimism about the future in his 1982 book The Coming Boom, Kahn argued that pro-growth tax and fiscal policies, development of information technology, and developments by the energy industry would make possible a period of unprecedented prosperity in the Western world by the early 21st century. Kahn was among the first to foresee unconventional extraction techniques like hydraulic fracturing.

Within 20 years, Hudson had become an international research institute with offices in Bonn, Paris, Brussels, Montreal and Tokyo. Other research projects were related to South Korea, Singapore, Australia and Latin America.

1983 to 2000

After Kahn's sudden death on July 7, 1983, Hudson was restructured. Actively recruited by the City of Indianapolis and the Lilly Endowment, Hudson relocated its headquarters to Indiana during 1984. In 1987, Mitch Daniels, a former aide to Senator Richard Lugar (R-IN) and President Ronald Reagan, was appointed CEO of Hudson Institute.

Daniels recruited new scholars and experts to the institute. William Eldridge Odom, former Director of the National Security Agency, became Hudson's director of national security studies; economist Alan Reynolds became director of economic research. Technologist George Gilder led a project on the implications of the digital era for American society.

In 1990, Daniels quit Hudson Institute to become Vice President of Corporate Affairs at Eli Lilly and Company. He was succeeded as CEO by Leslie Lenkowsky, a social scientist, and former consultant to Senator Daniel Patrick Moynihan. Under Lenkowsky, Hudson emphasized domestic and social policy. During the early 1990s, the institute did work concerning education reform and applied research on charter school and school choice.

Also in 1990, the Hudson Institute spun off a subsidiary non-profit organization which took the name the Discovery Institute.

At the initiative of Wisconsin Governor Tommy Thompson, Hudson designed the "Wisconsin Works" welfare-to-work program that was adopted nationwide in the 1996 federal welfare-reform legislation signed by President Bill Clinton. In 2001, President George W. Bush's initiative on charitable choice was based on Hudson's research into social-service programs administered by faith-based organizations.

Other Hudson research from this period included 1987's "Workforce 2000", the best-selling research institute study of its time, which predicted the transformation of the American labor market and workplace due to diversification and computerization, the "Blue Ribbon Commission on Hungary" (1990) and "International Baltic Economic Commission" (1991–93), which contributed to the adoption of market-oriented reforms in the newly independent states of Eastern Europe, and the 1997 follow-up study "Workforce 2020". 

In 1997, Lenkowsky was succeeded by Herbert London.

2001 to present 
After the September 11 attacks, Hudson emphasized international issues such as the Middle East, Latin America and Islam. On 1 July 2004, Hudson relocated its headquarters to Washington, DC, and began emphasizing research concerning national security and foreign policy issues.

In 2016, Hudson relocated from its McPherson Square headquarters to a custom-built office space on Pennsylvania Avenue, near the U.S. Capitol and the White House. The new LEED-certified offices were designed by FOX Architects. The Prime Minister of Japan Shinzō Abe presided over the opening of the new offices.

Hudson offers two annual awards, the Herman Kahn Award and the Global Leadership Awards. Past Hudson Institute honorees include United Nations Ambassador Nikki Haley, House Speaker Paul Ryan, Vice President Mike Pence, Mike Pompeo, Ronald Reagan, Henry Kissinger, Rupert Murdoch, Dick Cheney, Joseph Lieberman, Benjamin Netanyahu, David Petraeus, and Shinzo Abe.

During the presidency of Donald Trump, the Hudson Institute was supportive of the administration. Vice President Michael Pence used the institute as his venue for a major policy speech concerning China on 4 October 2018. In 2021, it was announced that former Secretary of State for Donald Trump, Mike Pompeo was joining the institute. It was reported that this would "provide him a platform to remain involved in policy discussions ahead of a possible 2024 presidential bid". Sarah May Stern, chair of Hudson's board of trustees, said of Pompeo that he had an "exemplary record of public service". The Hudson Institute was also joined by Elaine Chao, Secretary of Transportation in the Trump administration.

In January 2021, Ken Weinstein, former president and CEO of Hudson Institute, became the first Walter P. Stern Distinguished Fellow.

Controversies and criticism 
The Hudson Institute has been criticised for endorsing an agenda of denial of climate change and accepting $7.9m from anonymous donors.

It has received funding from Exxon Mobil and Koch family Foundations both of which actively pursue policies of minimising the effect of climate change.

The New York Times commented on Dennis Avery's attacks on organic farming: "The attack on organic food by a well-financed research organization suggests that, though organic food accounts for only 1 percent of food sales in the United States, the conventional food industry is worried". Another employee of the institute, Michael Fumento, was revealed to have received funding from Monsanto for his 1999 book Bio-Evolution.  Monsanto's spokesman said: "It's our practice, that if we're dealing with an organization like this, that any funds we're giving should be unrestricted." Hudson's CEO and President Kenneth R. Weinstein told BusinessWeek that he was uncertain if the payment should have been disclosed. "That's a good question, period," he said.

The New York Times accused Huntington Ingalls Industries of using the Hudson Institute to enhance the company's argument for more nuclear-powered aircraft carriers, at a cost of US$11 billion each. The Times alleged that a former naval officer was paid by Hudson to publish an analysis endorsing more funding. The report was delivered to the House Armed Services subcommittee without disclosing that Huntington Ingalls had paid for part of the report. Hudson acknowledged the misconduct, describing it as a "mistake".

The institute, which publishes frequent reports concerning China, has received funding from the Taiwanese government. Critics note that although the funding is declared in its financial returns "none of their researchers disclose the potential conflict of interest between Taiwanese funding and advocating for more U.S. security guarantees for and trade with Taiwan".

The institute is described by its critics as "neoconservative".

The institute has also received funding from the US military. The group has recently endorsed “lead-ahead advancements like stealth aircraft” to compete with China and a greater emphasis on cyber warfare capabilities. The group received a $356,263 contract directly from the Pentagon this year to produce a “final report/brief” concerning aircraft defense. In 2020, it was paid nearly half a million dollars to produce reports and workshops on behalf of the Defense Department.

Political donations

Employees of the Hudson Institute have made substantial donations to Republican candidates and PACs. During the 2020 election cycle, they donated $151,000 to Republican candidates.

Policy centers
The Hudson Institute has various facilities and programs:

 Center for the Economics of the Internet
 Coronavirus Insights and Analysis
 South Asia Program
 Center for Defense Concepts and Technology
 Hamilton Commission on Securing America's National Security Innovation Base
 Current Trends in Islamist Ideology
 Center for Religious Freedom
 Food Policy Center
 Center for American Seapower
 Center for Substance Abuse Policy Research
 Kleptocracy Initiative
 Hudson Institute Political Studies
 First Step Act Independent Review Committee
 Japan Chair
 Forum for Intellectual Property

Funding
2019 Finances:

Notable personnel

Leadership

 John P. Walters, President and CEO
 Scooter Libby, Senior Vice President

Board of Trustees

 Linden S. Blue
 Rajeev Chandrasekhar
 Thomas J. Donohue

Other notable persons

 Raymond Aron
 Daniel Bell
 Marshall Billingslea
 Robert Bork
 Rudy Boschwitz
 Paul Bracken
 Elaine Chao
 Ezra Cohen
 Mitch Daniels
 Michael Doran
 Pierre S. du Pont, IV
 Ralph Ellison
 Saagar Enjeti
 Michael Fumento
 Alexander Haig
 Arthur L. Herman
 Michael Hudson (born 1939), economics professor
 Donald Kagan
 Amy A. Kass
 Henry Kissinger
 H. R. McMaster
 Walter Russell Mead
 Andrew Natsios
 William Odom
 John O'Sullivan
 Marcello Pera
 Mike Pompeo
 Michael Pillsbury
 Andrey Piontkovsky
 Ron Prosor
 Dan Quayle
 Ronald Radosh
 David Satter
 Abram Shulsky
 Irwin Stelzer
 David Tell
 Curtin Winsor Jr.

See also

 Discovery Institute

Notes and references

Further reading

 Blum, Ruthie. "Who's Right?" The Jerusalem Post, February 17, 2005: 13. (Free summary from fee-based archive.)
 Hadar, Leon T. "Special Report: The 'Neocons': From the Cold War to the 'Global Intifada' ". The Washington Report on Middle East Affairs 9.11 (Apr. 1991): 27. (Archived.)
 Hutchinson, Bill, with Michael McAuliff. "Cheney Eyed Israeli Strike on Iranian Nuclear Reactor – Mag". The New York Daily News, September 24, 2007, Nation/World: 7. (Archived.)
 Kirkpatrick, David D. "Lack of Resolution in Iraq Finds Conservatives Divided". The New York Times, April 19, 2004: A21.
 Lynch, Frederic R. "Workforce Diversity: PC's Final Frontier? – Political Correctness – Demystifying Multiculturalism". National Review, February 21, 1994: 32.  (Accessed via findarticles.com.)
 White, Andrew. "New York in the 1960s". The American Prospect, October 22, 2001: 40. [Book rev. of The Ungovernable City: John Lindsay and His Struggle to Save New York, by Vincent J. Cannato (New York: Basic Books, 2001).]

External links

 

 
1961 establishments in New York (state)
Eli Lilly and Company
Foreign policy and strategy think tanks in the United States
Foreign policy political advocacy groups in the United States
New Right (United States)
Non-profit organizations based in Washington, D.C.
Political and economic think tanks in the United States
RAND Corporation people
Think tanks established in 1961
Conservative organizations in the United States
Right-wing politics in the United States
Neoconservatism
Futures studies organizations